Middlewich is a town within the unitary authority of Cheshire East, England. It contains 41 buildings that are recorded in the National Heritage List for England as designated listed buildings. Of these, two are listed at Grade II*, the middle grade, and the others are at Grade II. The history of the area goes back to the Roman era when it was important for the production of salt. The salt industry in the region has continued since then, but it is not reflected in its listed buildings, other than by the canals. The Trent and Mersey Canal was opened in 1777, and the listed buildings associated with it consist of locks, mileposts, and other buildings and structures. The Middlewich Branch of the Shropshire Union Canal dates from 1829, and the listed buildings associated with this include aqueducts, locks, bridges, and a lock keeper's house. Otherwise, the listed buildings in the town are those usually found in towns, including a church with a sundial in the churchyard, houses, shops, a war memorial and a former mill. Outside the town, the area is rural, and the listed buildings include farmhouses and farm buildings.

Key

Buildings

See also

 Listed buildings in Bradwall
 Listed buildings in Byley
 Listed buildings in Moston
 Listed buildings in Sproston
 Listed buildings in Stanthorne
 Listed buildings in Wimboldsley

References
Citations

Sources

 

Listed buildings in the Borough of Cheshire East
Lists of listed buildings in Cheshire